The discography of Billie Holiday, an American jazz singer, consists of 12 studio albums, three live albums, 24 compilations, six box sets, and 38 singles.

Holiday recorded extensively for six labels: Columbia Records (on its subsidiary labels Brunswick Records, Vocalion Records, and Okeh Records), from 1933 through 1942; Commodore Records in 1939 and 1944; Decca Records from 1944 through 1950; briefly for Aladdin Records in 1951; Verve Records and its earlier imprint Clef Records, from 1952 through 1957; again for Columbia Records from 1957 to 1958 and MGM Records in 1959. Many of Holiday's recordings were released on 78-rpm records, before the advent of long-playing vinyl records, and only Clef, Verve, and Columbia issued Holiday albums during her lifetime that were not compilations of previously released material. Many compilations have been issued since her death, including comprehensive box sets and live recordings.

Studio albums

Clef Records and Verve Records, 1952–1958

Columbia Records and MGM Records, 1958–1959

Live albums

Compilation albums
Most of Holiday's albums prior to 1952 were made up of material previously released as singles.

{|class=wikitable
|-
! Year
! Title
! Label and number
|-
| 1946
| Billie Holiday  (four 78-rpm records)
| Commodore CR-2
|-
| 1946
| Fancy Free (four 78-rpm records)
| Decca DA-406
|-
| 1947
| Teddy Wilson–Billie Holiday, Hot Jazz Classics (four 78-rpm records)
| Columbia C-61
|-
| 1947
| A Hot Jazz Classic Set, Vol. 1 (four 78-rpm records)
| Columbia-135
|-
| 1947
| Distinctive Song Stylings (four 78-rpm records)
| Decca A-652
|-
| 1949
| Teddy Wilson and His Orchestra Featuring Billie Holiday (10")
| Columbia  CL-6040
|-
| 1950
| An Evening with Eddie Heywood and Billie Holiday (10")
| Commodore FL 30001
|-
| 1950
| Ella, Lena and Billie (10")
| Columbia CL 2531
|-
| 1950
| Billie Holiday Sings (10")
| Columbia CL 6129
|-
| 1950
| Billie Holiday Volume One (10")
| Commodore 20005
|-
| 1950
| Billie Holiday Volume Two (10")
| Commodore 20006
|-
| 1951
| Billie Holiday and Teddy Wilson (7")
| Columbia ESDF 1038
|-
| 1951
| Favorites (10")
| Columbia CL 6163
|-
| 1951
| Lover Man (10")
| Decca DL 5345
|-
| 1954
| Billie Holiday and Teddy Wilson Orchestras
| Columbia 33 S 1034
|-
| 1954
| Lady Day
| Columbia CL 637
|-
| 1954
| Billie Holiday Volume One
| Jolly Roger 5020
|-
| 1954
| Billie Holiday Volume Two
| Jolly Roger 5021
|-
| 1954
| Billie Holiday Volume Three
| Jolly Roger 5022
|-
| 1955
| A Collection of Classic Jazz Interpretations by Billie Holiday (10")
| Columbia B-1949
|-
| 1956
| A Recital by Billie Holiday
| Clef MGC 686
|-
| 1956
| Solitude
| Clef MGC 690 / Verve V6-8074
|-
| 1956
| Hall of Fame Series (7")
| Columbia B-2534
|-
| 1956
| Jazz Recital (partial reissue of Billie Holiday at JATP)
| Verve MGC 718
|-
| 1956
| The Lady Sings
| Decca DL 8215
|-
| 1957 (released 1999)
| A Midsummer Night's Jazz at Stratford '57
| Baldwin Street 308
|-
| 1957
| The Sound of Jazz (various artists)
| Columbia CL 1098
|-
|1957
| The Unforgettable Lady Day
| Verve V 8338-2 2 LP
|-
| 1958
| ''The Blues Are Brewin| Decca DL 8701
|-
| 1958
| Lover Man
| Decca DL 8702
|-
| 1958
| Billie Holiday
| Commodore 30008
|-
| 1958 (released 1986)
| At Monterey
| Blackhawk 50701
|-
| 1959
| Seven Ages of Jazz
| Metrojazz 1009
|-
| 1970
| Billie Holiday's Greatest Hits
| Columbia CL 2666
|-
| 1993
| 16 Most Requested Songs
| Columbia/Legacy CK 53776
|-
| 2002
| Lady Day Swings
| Columbia/Legacy COL 508608 2
|-
|}

Box sets

Singles

Compositions
1936:  "Billie's Blues" (also known as "I Love My Man")
1939:  "Our Love Is Different"
1939:  "Long Gone Blues"
1939:  "Fine and Mellow"
1939:  "Everything Happens for the Best"
1940:  "Tell Me More and More and Then Some"
1941:  "God Bless the Child"
1944:  "Don't Explain"
1949:  "Somebody's on My Mind"
1949:  "Now or Never"
1954:  "Stormy Blues"
1956:  "Lady Sings the Blues"Never recorded'''

1939:  "Lost at the Crossroads of Love"
1940:  "Say I'm Yours Again"
1949:  "Close Dem Eyes My Darlin'"
1952:  "Please Don't Do It in Here"
1952:  "You'd Do It Anyway"
1955:  "Preacher Boy"
1957:  "Left Alone"
1957:  "Who Needs You (Baby)"

Notes

References

 Lady Love is a 1962 issue of selections from a concert in Basel, Switzerland, February 4, 1954, during Holiday's 1954 European tour, "Jazz Club U.S.A." The location and date of this session had been previously listed incorrectly as a concert in Cologne, January 23, 1954. The correction was supplied by Arild Widerøe, a Swiss Jazz discographer. The master recording was taken from a tape supplied by Roman Flury, a musicologist and editor at Radio Basel (the station ran from 1926 to 1972) and given to Leonard Feather.
 Side A:
 Announcement, by Leonard Feather 0:26
 "Blue Moon" 2:08
 "All of Me" 1:38
 "My Man" 2:45
 "Them There Eyes" 1:30
 "I Cried For You" 3:10
 "What a Little Moonlight Can Do" 2:25
 "I Cover The Waterfront" 3:10
 Side B:
 "Billie's Blues" 11:28
 "Lover, Come Back to Me" 6:35
 Personnel:
 Bass – Red Mitchell (tracks: A2 to B2)
 Clarinet – Buddy DeFranco (tracks: B1, B2)
 Drums – Elaine Leighton (de) (1926–2012) (Beryl Booker's drummer) (tracks: A2 to B2)
 Guitar – Jimmy Raney (tracks: B1, B2)
 Liner Notes (Translation in French) – Leonard Feather
 Photography – Buck Hoeffler (né Paul J. Hoeffler; 1937–2005)
 Piano – Beryl Booker (tracks: B1, B2), Carl Drinkard (né Carlton Mark Drinkard; 1927–) (tracks: A2 to A8), Sonny Clark (tracks: B1, B2)
 Vibraphone – Red Norvo (tracks: B1, B2)
 Vocals – Billie Holiday (tracks: A2 to B2)

  .

  ; ; .

Vocal jazz discographies
Discographies of American artists
Discography